Olga Nikolayevna Anufriyeva (born August 18, 1974, in Moscow, Russian Soviet Federative Socialist Republic) is a Russian political figure, deputy of the 8th State Duma convocation. In 1996 she graduated from the State University of Management. Two years later, she was hired as an Assistant Minister to the Minister of Taxes and Duties of the Russian Federation. Since 2000, she has been a part of various expert state committees and working groups on tax-related matters.

Since September 19, 2021, she has served as a deputy of the State Duma of 8th convocation. She ran with the United Russia to represent the Khanty-Mansi Autonomous Okrug.

She is one of the members of the State Duma the United States Treasury sanctioned on 24 March 2022 in response to the 2022 Russian invasion of Ukraine.

References

1974 births
Living people
Politicians from Moscow
United Russia politicians
21st-century Russian politicians
Eighth convocation members of the State Duma (Russian Federation)
Russian individuals subject to the U.S. Department of the Treasury sanctions